The Royal Bank Tower is a skyscraper at 360 Saint-Jacques Street in Montreal, Quebec. The 22-storey  neo-classical tower was designed by the firm of York and Sawyer with the bank's Chief Architect Sumner Godfrey Davenport of Montreal. Upon completion in 1928, it was the tallest building in the entire British Empire, the tallest structure in all of Canada and the first building in the city that was taller than Montréal's Notre-Dame Basilica built nearly a century before.

The bank's first official head office was at Hollis and George in Halifax in 1879. In 1907 the Royal Bank of Canada moved its head office from Halifax to Montreal As the building at Saint-Jacques Street turned out to be too small, in 1926 the board of directors of the biggest bank in Canada hired New York architects York and Sawyer to build a prestigious new building a short distance westward on Saint-Jacques Street. Between 1920 and 1926 the bank had bought up all the property between Saint-Jacques, Saint-Pierre, Notre-Dame and Dollard Streets to demolish all the buildings there including the old Mechanics' Institute and the ten-storey Bank of Ottawa building in order to make space for the new 22-storey building.

In 1962, the Royal Bank moved its main office to another famous Montreal building, Place Ville-Marie, however kept a branch in the impressive main hall of the old building, situated in Old Montreal. That branch relocated to the nearby Tour de la Bourse in July 2012.

See also
 Bank of Montreal Head Office, Montreal
 Molson Bank Building, Montreal
 Tour CIBC
 Old Canadian Bank of Commerce Building, Montreal
 Royal Bank Plaza - RBC corporate offices in Toronto

References

External links

Vieux-Montréal – Fiche d'un bâtiment: Banque Royale
360 Saint-Jacques - Technical Specifications

Skyscrapers in Montreal
Royal Bank of Canada
Landmarks in Montreal
Office buildings in Montreal
Office buildings completed in 1928
Old Montreal
Historic bank buildings in Canada
Neoclassical architecture in Canada
1928 establishments in Quebec
Skyscraper office buildings in Canada